Emil Holm (2 September 1877 – 12 April 1925) was a Finnish sport shooter who competed in the 1912 Summer Olympics. He was born in Larsmo.

In 1912 he was a member of the Finnish team which finished fifth in the team free rifle competition. In the 300 metre free rifle, three positions he finished 49th.

References

https://www.findagrave.com/memorial/134276097/george-holm

1877 births
1925 deaths
Finnish male sport shooters
ISSF rifle shooters
Olympic shooters of Finland
Shooters at the 1912 Summer Olympics
People from Larsmo
Sportspeople from Ostrobothnia (region)